In Bayesian statistics, a credible interval is an interval within which an unobserved parameter value falls with a particular probability. It is an interval in the domain of a posterior probability distribution or a predictive distribution. The generalisation to multivariate problems is the credible region. 

Credible intervals are analogous to confidence intervals and confidence regions in frequentist statistics, although they differ on a philosophical basis: Bayesian intervals treat their bounds as fixed and the estimated parameter as a random variable, whereas frequentist confidence intervals treat their bounds as random variables and the parameter as a fixed value.  Also, Bayesian credible intervals use (and indeed, require) knowledge of the situation-specific prior distribution, while the frequentist confidence intervals do not.

For example, in an experiment that determines the distribution of possible values of the parameter , if the subjective probability that  lies between 35 and 45 is 0.95, then  is a 95% credible interval.

Choosing a credible interval
Credible intervals are not unique on a posterior distribution. Methods for defining a suitable credible interval include:
Choosing the narrowest interval, which for a unimodal distribution will involve choosing those values of highest probability density including the mode (the maximum a posteriori). This is sometimes called the highest posterior density interval (HPDI).
Choosing the interval where the probability of being below the interval is as likely as being above it. This interval will include the median. This is sometimes called the equal-tailed interval.
Assuming that the mean exists, choosing the interval for which the mean is the central point.
It is possible to frame the choice of a credible interval within decision theory and, in that context, a smallest interval will always be a highest probability density set. It is bounded by the contour of the density.

Credible intervals can also be estimated through the use of simulation techniques such as Markov chain Monte Carlo.

Contrasts with confidence interval

A frequentist 95% confidence interval means that with a large number of repeated samples, 95% of such calculated confidence intervals would include the true value of the parameter. In frequentist terms, the parameter is fixed (cannot be considered to have a distribution of possible values) and the confidence interval is random (as it depends on the random sample).

Bayesian credible intervals can be quite different from frequentist confidence intervals for two reasons:
credible intervals incorporate problem-specific contextual information from the prior distribution whereas confidence intervals are based only on the data;
credible intervals and confidence intervals treat nuisance parameters in radically different ways.

For the case of a single parameter and data that can be summarised in a single sufficient statistic, it can be shown that the credible interval and the confidence interval will coincide if the unknown parameter is a location parameter (i.e. the forward probability function has the form  ), with a prior that is a uniform flat distribution; and also if the unknown parameter is a scale parameter (i.e. the forward probability function has the form  ), with a Jeffreys' prior     — the latter following because taking the logarithm of such a scale parameter turns it into a location parameter with a uniform distribution.
But these are distinctly special (albeit important) cases; in general no such equivalence can be made.

References

Further reading
 

Bayesian estimation
Statistical intervals